is a Japanese sculptor and contemporary artist living and working in both, Tokyo and Prague (Czech Republic).

Life and career

2005–2007 Scholarship from Czech Republic Ministry of Education, Youth And Sports, Studies at Academy of Fine Arts in Prague (AVU)

2008 Master's degree of Arts, Tokyo University of the Arts (TUA)

2010 Scholarship given by Japanese government (Bunkachou) after being chosen as the only one from all artists under 32 years of age.

2022 Ph.D. Jan Evangelista Purkyně University in Ústí nad Labem, Faculty of Art and Design, Visual communication course

Exhibitions
2013 H’art Gallery (Bucharest, Romania)
2014 Dai-ichi Life South Gallery (Tokyo, Japan)
2016 TEZUKAYAMA Gallery (Osaka, Japan)
2016 Jan Koniarek Gallery (Trnava, Slovakia)
2020 Egon Schiele Art Centrum (Cesky Krumlov, Czech Republic)

Group exhibitions
2017 SIGNAL festival 2017 (Prague, Czech Republic)
2017 VOLTA13 (Basel, Switzerland)
2019 INVALIDOVNA (Prague, Czech Republic)

Artist-in-residence & Sculpture Symposium
2013 Egon Schiele Art Centrum (Český Krumlov, Czech Republic)
2015 The 12 th International Glass Symposium (Nový Bor, Czech Republic)
2015 AIAV Artist-in-residence program (Yamaguchi, Japan)

Grants and scholarships
2009 The Japan Foundation
2010 Pola Art Foundation
2011 Japanese Government Overseas Study Programme for Artists (3 years)
2016 Scholarship, Czech Republic Ministry of Education, Youth And Sports
2017 THE SATOH ARTCRAFT RESEARCH & SCHOLARSHIP FOUNDATION

References

External links 

 Web Site
  B GALLERY (Tokyo, Japan)
  H’art Gallery (Bucharest, Romania)
 2014  Dai-ichi Life South Gallery (Tokyo, Japan)
 2014  Pola Museum Annex 2014 (Tokyo, Japan)
 2014  European Glass Experience Exhibition in Finland (Riihimaki, Finland)

Artist in Residence & Sculpture Symposium
  C.C.N (Graz, Austria)

1980 births
Living people
Japanese sculptors
Tokyo University of the Arts alumni
Artists from Tokyo
Japanese contemporary artists